Hungry Young Poets (aka HYP) was a band founded in the Philippines in 1996. They were originally formed as a duo by Barbie Almalbis (guitarist, vocalist, and songwriter) and Ricci Gurango (bassist). After releasing their first and only self-titled album, Franklin Benitez (drummer) officially completed the lineup as a trio.

In 1998, Gurango left the band to lead the cover band Little Green Men, before forming Mojofly. With Gurango's assertion of rights to the band's name, Almalbis and Benitez would later rename the group to Barbie's Cradle.

Barbie's Cradle later became a popular band, with Barbie Almalbis as lead vocalist, guitarist and songwriter, and Franklin Benitez as drummer. Rommel dela Cruz then joined the group as bassist, and by 1999, drummer Wendell Garcia joined replacing Benitez.

In 2005, the group disbanded and Almalbis went on to pursue a solo career, while Rommel dela Cruz soon became the bassist of Freestyle (the original bassist migrated to Australia).

Discography
1998 - Barbie's Cradle
2000 - Music from the Buffet Table
2003 - Playing in the Fields

Awards
 2001 Katha Awards
 Best Electronica Composition, "Up and at 'Em" (Power Puff Girls CD)
 Best Folk Song, "Dear Paul"
 Best Folk Vocal Performance, "Dear Paul" (single) by Barbie Almalbis
 2001 NU107 Rock Awards
 Best Music Video, "Money For Food" (video) by Monty Parungao
 2000 Katha Awards
 Best Alternative Song, "Goodnyt" (single)
 Best Album Packaging, Barbie's Cradle (self-titled) by Barbie Almalbis/Yvette Co
 PARI 13th Awit Awards 2000
 Best Album Packaging, Barbie's Cradle (self-titled)
 1999 New Artist Awards Festival, 99.5RT
 Best New Pop-Alternative Artist, Barbie's Cradle
 1998 RX 93.1 OPM Yearend awards: Band of the Year
 Best New Pop-Alternative Artist, Hungry Young Poets
 1998 RX 93.1 OPM Yearend awards: 
 Top 7 OPM Request, Firewoman (2nd Place)

References

External links
 Online Registry of Filipino Musical Artists and Their Works: Hungry Young Poets
 Online Registry of Filipino Musical Artists and Their Works: Barbie's Cradle
 The Philippine Association of the Record Industry, Inc. (PARI)

Filipino rock music groups
Musical groups established in 1997
Female-fronted musical groups